Adama Jalloh (born 1993) is a British photographer of Sierra Leonean heritage whose work has been exhibited at Tate Modern and the V&A Museum. She specialises in portraiture and documentary photography.

Early life and education
Jalloh was born in 1993 to Sierra Leonean parents and is based in London. She has a BA in commercial photography from the Arts University Bournemouth, and won the British Journal of Photography Breakthrough Award for a single image by an undergraduate in 2015.

Career
Jalloh's work has been included in exhibitions including "After Hours: Soul of A Nation" (2015) at Tate Modern, London (featuring her commission Familiar Faces); "Celebration of African Female Photographers" (2018) at Nubuke Foundation, Accra, Ghana; "No Place Like Home" Friday Late (2019), V&A Museum, London (which exhibited her project "Love Story"); and "Bamako Encounters - African Biennale of Photography" (2019), Mali.

From October 2020 to September 2021 the Horniman Museum in London hosted the exhibition "An Ode To Afrosurrealism" comprising photographs by Jalloh and Hamed Maiye.

Jalloh has undertaken commissions from publications and organizations including Alexander McQueen. In the area of music she has portrayed artists including Zara McFarlane, Yussef Kamaal, Shabaka Hutchings, Little Simz, Freddie Gibbs, and Mr Eazi.

References

External links

1993 births
Living people
21st-century British photographers
British women photographers
Black British women
British people of Sierra Leonean descent
Alumni of Arts University Bournemouth